Universal's Epic Universe is an upcoming theme park being constructed as part of the Universal Orlando Resort in Orlando, Florida. Its construction was announced in August 2019 but was delayed in April 2020 due to the COVID-19 pandemic. Most of the construction paused in July 2020 for nearly a year before being restarted in March 2021.

Location
The theme park will be located a few miles south from the existing resort, within a larger  site south of Sand Lake Road and east of Universal Boulevard.

History
NBCUniversal announced on August 1, 2019, that it was building a third theme park as part of the Universal Orlando Resort. Without releasing details, Tom Williams, Chairman and Chief Executive Officer of Universal Destinations & Experiences, said Epic Universe would be the company's "most immersive and innovative theme park." Comcast and NBCUniversal officials said it would create an additional 14,000 jobs, including professional, technical, culinary and other specialized positions. A possible opening date for the park was not immediately announced. In October 2019, Universal announced that the park would open in 2023.

The project was delayed indefinitely in July 2020 due to the COVID-19 pandemic, but on March 3, 2021, Comcast announced the immediate restart of construction. On January 27, 2022, Jeff Shell, CEO of NBCUniversal, stated during an earnings call that the park would be opening Summer 2025. This was hinted at by the resort's official Twitter shortly thereafter. On May 5, 2022, Universal offered 13 acres of land near the site where Epic Universe is being built for a Brightline rail route commuter station.

Attractions

Concept art released by Universal during the official announcement in August 2019 left details purposefully vague. However, in January 2020, Universal confirmed the presence of Super Nintendo World. A Comcast executive reaffirmed it that same month.

References

 
Amusement parks in Orlando, Florida
Tourist attractions in Greater Orlando
Epic Universe